Jana Gana Mana is the national anthem of India.

Jana Gana Mana may also refer to:
 Jana Gana Mana (hymn), also known as Bharoto Bhagyo Bidhata, the song from which the national anthem was excerpted
 Jana Gana Mana (2012 film), an Indian film starring Nandu Madhav and Chinmay Sant
 Jana Gana Mana (2022 film), an Indian film starring Prithviraj Sukumaran and Suraj Venjaramoodu
Jana Gana Mana (2023 film), an unfinished Indian Telugu-language military action film
 Jana Gana Mana (music video), a video released in January 2000 to mark the 50th year of the Indian republic